The Witch of Konotop is a satirical fiction story by Ukrainian writer Hryhorii Kvitka-Osnovianenko written in 1833 and published in 1837 in his second book of "Little Russian (Ukrainian) stories".

The story tells of Cossack centurion of the Konotop hundred Nikita Ulasovich Zabryokha, his clerk Pistryak, and the witch Yavdokha Zubikha. The work consists of 14 chapters and an epilogue; each section begins with the words "sad and gloomy".

Plot
The work begins with a description of Konotop centurion Nikita Ulasovich Zabryokha sitting "sad and gloomy". The previous day, he had gone to woo Olena, a hard-working and beautiful girl who had no parents, but only a brother; Zabryokha asked the brother if he would give his sister in marriage, but the brother rejected the proposal.

While the centurion sits at home, the clerk Pistryak comes to him with a stick marked with notches indicating the number of Cossacks in the hundred; however, having broken the stick while bringing it into the house, he initially miscounts the number of Cossacks. When Zabryokha discovers the error, he ridicules Pistryak in front of the hundred, offending him. Shortly thereafter, an order arrives from the Chernihiv Regiment to go on a campaign, but the scribe refuses to carry out the order, and writes a letter informing the regiment that the Cossacks cannot come to Konotop because they must undertake a witch hunt because there has been no rain in Konotop for a long time.

The next day, the whole city gathers near the pond. The scribe has kidnapped several women suspected of being witches, and prescribes a test: each woman is thrown into the water, and if she drowns, she is not a witch, and if she survives, she is a witch. Many women die in the water. The witch turns out to be Yavdokha Zubikha, who floats calmly on the water. Enraged men began to beat her, but Yavdokha uses her magic to escape. 

Later, Zabryokha and Pistryak (separately) come to Zubikha with gifts and ask for help. She initially casts a spell so that Olena falls in love with Zabryokha and wants to marry him. Judge Demyan Khalyavsky, Olena's former lover, now sits sad and unhappy because she is now marrying someone else, but Zubikha offers to help him, too. To get her revenge on her assailants, the witch arranges things so Olena marries Khalyavsky after all, and Zabryokha marries the scariest girl in the village, Solokha. Shortly thereafter, Zabryokha is removed from his position for not complying with the Chernihiv regiment's orders, as is Pistryak, and Khalyavsky becomes the new captain.

In the epilogue, the author writes that this tale was told to him by the late Panas Mesiura, and reveals the ending to the story: Khalyavsky was not a centurion for long, because he quickly upset his superiors, and his marriage to Olena was unhappy because it was the result of witchcraft. Zabryokha and Pistryak were punished for drowning innocent women, and the witch died a short time later.

Reception
Hryhoriy Hrabovych described The Witch of Konotop as "perhaps the best work of Ukrainian prose of the early 19th century".

Adaptations and legacy
The work was made into a film by the studio Ukrtelefilm in 1987, and again in 1990 by director Galina Shigaeva for the Alexander Dovzhenko film studio. 

It was also adapted as a screenplay by Bogdan Zholdak and performed by the Ivan Franko National Academic Drama Theater in 1982, and performed as a burlesque rap in 2016. 

The politician Nataliya Vitrenko was nicknamed "the Witch of Konotop" in reference to the story.

Notes

Link

 Text of the story on the website ukrlit.org

Konotop
Satirical works
Ukrainian novels